Faujdarhat K. M. High School is a secondary school in Faujdarhat, Sitakunda Upazila, Chittagong District, Bangladesh. It is situated at the side of the Faujdarhat Market. It was established in 1956. The area of the institution is 160 shatak. There are about 1500 students and 40 teachers in this school.

Students and teachers 
There are about 1500 students in this school from grade 6th to grade 10th. And approximately 40 teachers teach lessons to the students. The current Head master of this school is Aminul Islam. The students cabinet election also held regularly.

References

High schools in Bangladesh
Educational institutions established in 1956
1956 establishments in East Pakistan
Schools in Chittagong District